Neptune's Net is a seafood restaurant and biker bar in Malibu, California. The landmark has been featured in countless television and film productions.

History
In 1956, the site began as a gas station, real-estate office, and restaurant called Panorama Pacific at Solimar on property owned by Eastman N. "Jake" Jacobs near the Pacific Coast Highway on the Ventura-Los Angeles county line. The locals soon began calling the restaurant - which served burgers, sandwiches and fried seafood classics - simply Jake's Diner. Jacobs was an aerodynamicist and engineer who contributed major advances in aeronautics, including the design and applications of advanced airfoils and wind tunnels, and initial studies of then-futuristic concepts such as jet propulsion and nuclear fusion. In the 60s, Jacobs leased the restaurant to a Venice family, who took a shot in the "restaurant" business. There were John and Jean Leech, their three children, Myrna, Richard and Becky, Grandparents, Ollie and Kathryn. The whole family worked there from 6:00am until 9:30pm. All the surfers loved John for allowing them to work for a cup of coffee and breakfast. The hardworking family decided to move back to L.A. when rumor surfaced of a proposed eminent domain forcing a road right through the property east to the 101.  In 1974, Jacobs sold the place to Paul Seay and his wife Dolly, and the couple changed the name to Neptune's Net. Chong Lee and his wife Michelle purchased the restaurant from the Seays on July 4, 1991, and are the current owners.

In film and television
Losin' It (1983) - Woody (Tom Cruise), Dave (Jackie Earle Haley), Spider (John Stockwell), and Wendell (John P. Navin Jr.) engaged in an epic food fight at Neptune's Net. Former owner Dolly Seay said "…two years after, I was cleaning up the mess.” 
Point Break (1991) Johnny Utah (Keanu Reeves) approaches Tyler (Lori Petty), who works at the restaurant in the film, and concocts a story about his parents dying in order to have her teach him surfing and go undercover.
The Fast and the Furious (2001) - Brian O'Conner (Paul Walker) and Dominic Toretto (Vin Diesel) eat lunch at the restaurant after test driving the newly built Toyota Supra on California State Route 1.
The Hills (2006) - In the October 6, 2009 episode of the reality show ("Mess with Me, Mess with You"), Kristin Cavallari takes her first motorcycle ride to eat at the restaurant.
Gossip Girl (2009) - For the '80s flashback episode entitled "Valley Girls," Lily (Brittany Snow) gets kicked out of boarding school and runs away to Los Angeles. Brittany makes a telephone call in front of the Neptune's Net sign before heading back on PCH.
People Like Us (2012) - This film features a lunch scene with the characters Sam (Chris Pine), Frankie (Elizabeth Banks), and Josh (Michael Hall D'Addario). 
Iron Man 3 (2013) - A replica of the restaurant was used as the film was mostly shot in Florida.
GTA V (2013) - An identical structure of the restaurant's building, called Hookie's is present in the fictional state of San Andreas, which is based on California.

References

External links
 

1958 establishments in California
Biker bars
Buildings and structures in Malibu, California
Restaurants established in 1958
Restaurants in Los Angeles
Seafood restaurants in California